"Watchtower" is the fifth single by British rapper Devlin, and the lead single from his second studio album, A Moving Picture (2013). The song features British singer-songwriter Ed Sheeran and was produced by Labrinth. "Watchtower" was released on 16 August 2012 and entered the UK Singles Chart on 26 August 2012 at number 7, becoming Devlin's highest-charting single and first top 10 hit and Sheeran's fifth top 10 hit. The song samples the main chorus line from Bob Dylan's "All Along the Watchtower". It also borrows Jimi Hendrix's riff from the guitarist's cover.

Use in media
It was used in the 2013 action-comedy film, 2 Guns. The instrumental was also used as the main theme for the series The Young Pope and the final one third of its sequel, The New Pope. It was also used in early promotional trailers for the Amazon Prime streaming television series Tom Clancy's Jack Ryan, which was released in 2018.

Music video
The official music video was uploaded onto Devlin's Vevo on 4 July 2012. It was directed by Corin Hardy.

Track listing
Digital download
 "Watchtower" (radio edit) (featuring Ed Sheeran) – 3:39
 "London City Part II" – 2:52
 "My Moving Picture" – 3:52
 "Watchtower" (instrumental) – 4:32

Charts

Certifications

References

2012 singles
2012 songs
Devlin (rapper) songs
Ed Sheeran songs
Song recordings produced by Labrinth
Songs written by Ed Sheeran
Songs written by Labrinth
Songs written by Bob Dylan
Universal Music Group singles
Island Records singles